Umm Tuba is a Palestinian Arab neighborhood in East Jerusalem part of Sur Baher; it is northeast of Har Homa and Bethlehem, and southeast of Kibbutz Ramat Rachel. It has a population of 4,000. After the 1967 Six-Day War, Umm Tuba was incorporated into the municipal district of Jerusalem.

Etymology
The name of the Arab village, "Umm Tuba," is derived from the Byzantine era name, "Metofa," itself a derivation of the  name Netofa. Netofa is mentioned in the Bible as the place from which two of King David's heroes originated.

History

Iron Age 
Based on archaeological finds, Umm Tuba was the site of the biblical city of Netophah.

Netophah was a prosperous Judean farming village during the First Temple period.  An archaeological excavation uncovered at least three royal seal impressions dating from the reign of Hezekiah, King of Judah (eighth century BCE). At least two "LMLK" (belonging to the King) impressions and two personal seal impressions were discovered on handles of large jars of the type used to store wine and olive oil.

Classical antiquity 
Artifacts dating to the Hasmonean period were found at the neighborhood.

Byzantine period 
Impressive remains of a Byzantine-era monastery have been found, which has been taken as proof that Umm Tuba was the site of “Metofa”, a place mentioned in the writings of Church elders in the Byzantine period.

Bell-shaped cisterns dug into rock have been discovered. Several tombs carved into rock, one with stone entrance has also been found, together with Byzantine ceramics.

Ottoman era
In 1596, Umm Tuba appeared in Ottoman tax registers as being in the Nahiya of Quds of the Liwa of Quds.  It had a population of 36 Muslim households. They paid a fixed tax-rate of 33,3 % on agricultural products, including  wheat, barley, olives, vines or fruit trees, and goats or beehives; a total of 7,500 Akçe. All of the revenue went to a Waqf.

French explorer Victor Guérin visited the place in 1863,  and described caves and other possible remains from a Christian period.
In 1883, the PEF's  Survey of Western Palestine (SWP) described the village as "an ancient site with bell-mouthed cisterns and ruins of modern buildings. To the east is a Mukam of Neby Toda."

British mandate era
In the 1922 census of Palestine conducted by the British Mandate authorities, Umm Tuba was counted with Sur Baher, which had a population of 993, all Muslims, increasing in the 1931 census to 1529, still all Muslim, in 308 inhabited houses.

In the 1945 statistics  the population of Umm Tuba, together with Sur Baher, was 2,450, all Muslims, who owned 8,915 dunams of land  according to an official land and population survey. 911 dunams were plantations and irrigable land, 3,927 used  for cereals, while 56 dunams were built-up (urban) land.

Jordanian era
In the wake of the 1948 Arab–Israeli War, and after the 1949 Armistice Agreements,  Umm Tuba came under Jordanian 
rule.

Many refugees came to Umm Tuba after the 1948 Arab–Israeli War.

The Jordanian census of 1961 found 543 inhabitants.

1967-present
After the Six-Day War in 1967,  Umm Tuba has been under Israeli occupation.

After  the 1995 accords 40% of Sur Baher/Umm Tuba land is defined as being in Area A, 3% in Area B, while the remaining 57% is in Area C. In 1997, Israel confiscated 354 dunams of land from Umm Tuba for the  Israeli settlements of Har Homa.

Education
In 2005, a minefield on the outskirts of Sur Baher was cleared of hundreds of Jordanian mines by Israel to ready the site for the construction of a new high school, which serves both Sur Baher and Umm Tuba. 
The Wingate Charitable Trust has established a joint Jewish-Arab project in which fifth and sixth graders from Umm Tuba and Kiryat HaYovel study science together. At each meeting the children learn about a scientific concept, while becoming acquainted with each other's language and culture. Through the Abraham Project at the Bible Lands Museum in Givat Ram, fourth graders from Umm Tuba meet with their Jewish peers to learn about their common ancestor, Abraham/Ibrahim. In 2012, Umm Tuba
Elementary School took part in an environmental water conservation project financed by the Jerusalem Foundation.

Demography
In 2008, Prof. Tamar Rapoport and Afnan Masarwah of the Hebrew University of Jerusalem presented their research on changing perspectives of motherhood, children and family relationships among women in Umm Tuba.

Notable people

 Muhammad Abu Tir

References

Bibliography

External links
Welcome to Sur Bahir & Umm Tuba
Survey of Western Palestine, Map 17:  IAA, Wikimedia commons 
 Sur Bahir and Umm Tuba (fact sheet), Applied Research Institute–Jerusalem, ARIJ
Sur Bahir & Umm Tuba town profile, ARIJ
  Sur Bahir & Umm Tuba aerial photo, ARIJ
   Construction at a New Location on Abu Ghnaim Mountain (Har Homa Settlement) 18, November, 2000, ARIJ
 The snaking Wall enters area (A) in Bethlehem 04, December, 2003, ARIJ
  House demolition in East Jerusalem during the month of August 30, September, 2004, ARIJ
  House demolition cases and testimonies from Jerusalem 19, September, 2006, ARIJ

Neighbourhoods of Jerusalem
Arab neighborhoods in Jerusalem
Hebrew Bible places